Discus ruderatus is a species of air-breathing land snail, a terrestrial pulmonate gastropod mollusk in the family Discidae, the disk snails.

Distribution 
This species occurs in:
 Czech Republic
 Ukraine

References

Discidae
Gastropods described in 1821